Tafton is an unincorporated community in Pulaski County, Arkansas, United States.

It is in the Little Rock-North Little Rock Metropolitan Area. It is located just north of Wrightsville, Arkansas.
It is the second ward. 

Unincorporated communities in Pulaski County, Arkansas
Unincorporated communities in Arkansas